Kaduney-e Sofla (also Romanized as Kādūney-e Soflá; also known as Delbar Sādāt-e Soflá) is a village in Veysian Rural District, Veysian District, Dowreh County, Lorestan Province, Iran. At the 2006 census, its population was 151, in 33 families.

References 

Towns and villages in Dowreh County